Super Fun Night is an American sitcom that aired from October 2, 2013, to February 19, 2014, on ABC. The series was broadcast during the 2013–14 television season on ABC in the Wednesday night 9:30 pm (ET/PT) slot after Modern Family. The series starred and was created by Rebel Wilson; it was green-lit by ABC for a series order pick-up on May 10, 2013. On May 9, 2014, ABC canceled the series after one season.

Premise
For the past 13 years, three single ladies have set aside every Friday night as "Friday Fun Night". That is, until one of the women, Kimmie Boubier (played by Wilson), decides it is time to take this party to the next level after befriending a fellow attorney.

Cast and characters

Main
 Rebel Wilson as Kimberley "Kimmie" Boubier – Kimmie is a young attorney who is slightly childish but when it comes down to it, she can be professional. She is in love with Richard although for the first half of the season, he seems to just see her as a friend.
 Lauren Ash as Marika – Marika is Kimmie's friend, a tennis instructor. She later comes out as a lesbian. 
 Liza Lapira as Helen-Alice - Helen-Alice is Kimmie's OCD and germophobic actuary friend. She has trouble developing her relationship with Benji as she lacks confidence in her romantic endeavours.
 Kevin Bishop as Richard Royce, Kimmie's co-worker whom she has a crush on.
 Kate Jenkinson as Kendall Quinn, Kimmie's antagonistic co-worker who briefly dates Richard.

Recurring
 Ashley Tisdale as Jazmine Boubier, Kimmie's sister.
 Dan Ahdoot as Ruby, Kimmie, Marika and Helen-Alice's neighbor who lives with Dan and Benji.
 John Gemberling as Dan, Kimmie, Marika and Helen-Alice's neighbor who lives with Ruby and Benji.
 Paul Rust as Benji, Kimmie, Marika and Helen-Alice's neighbor who lives with Dan and Ruby.
 Nate Torrence as James, Richard's friend and Kimmie's boyfriend.
 Hana Mae Lee as Frankie, Marika's girlfriend
 Brando Marler as Danny, Kimmie's cousin
 Anastasia Pimenov as Young Kimmie
 Matt Lucas as Derrick, Kimmie's co-worker
 Amy Vorpahl as Snarling Hannah, Kimmie's co-worker
 Darin Brooks as Jason, Jazmine's boyfriend

Production

Development
Super Fun Night was originally planned for CBS as a possible pilot for the 2012–13 season. After the network passed on the project, Warner Bros. took it over to ABC. It became a fast track to greenlight status, resulting in the series receiving a pick-up for the 2013–14 season. The series original pilot was filmed in multi-camera but was changed by ABC to single-camera.The series premiered with the intended second episode instead of the pilot. This caused the Halloween episode to air over 2 weeks before Halloween. The pilot would later air as the eighth episode.

Casting
In the CBS pilot, the lead roles were to star Wilson, Jenny Slate and Edi Patterson, but after ABC picked up the project, both Slate and Patterson were dropped from the cast, and the show was retooled, with Lauren Ash and Liza Lapira landing the co-leads. Other casting changes from the pilot include Jazmine Boubier (played by Deborah Baker Jr., later recast to Ashley Tisdale), Jason, Jazmine's boyfriend (played by Alan Ritchson, later recast to Darin Brooks), and Felicity Vanderstone, played by Kelen Coleman.  In the case of Vanderstone, the character was recast and renamed Kendall Quinn (played by Australian actress, Kate Jenkinson).

Episodes
{{Episode table |total_width=99 |background=#571B7E |overall= |title= |director= |writer= |airdate= |prodcode= |viewers= |country=U.S. |episodes=

{{Episode list
|EpisodeNumber = 6
|Title = The Love Lioness
|DirectedBy = Rodman Flender
|WrittenBy = Jen Braeden
|OriginalAirDate = 
|ProdCode = 2J6957
|Viewers = 5.84<ref>{{cite web|url=http://tvbythenumbers.zap2it.com/2013/11/14/wednesday-final-ratings-revolution-arrow-the-middle-super-fun-night-adjusted-down/215660|archive-url=https://web.archive.org/web/20131115105719/http://tvbythenumbers.zap2it.com/2013/11/14/wednesday-final-ratings-revolution-arrow-the-middle-super-fun-night-adjusted-down/215660/|url-status=dead|archive-date=November 15, 2013|title=Wednesday Final Ratings: 'Revolution', 'Arrow', 'The Middle' & 'Survivor Adjusted Up; 'Super Fun Night' Adjusted Down|last=Bibel|first=Sara|work=TV by the Numbers|date=November 14, 2013|access-date=November 14, 2013}}</ref>
|ShortSummary = Kimmie, Marika and Helen-Alice attend a seminar given by a relationship guru (played by Molly Shannon).
|LineColor = 571B7E
}}

}}

International broadcast
In Canada, City TV simulcasted the ABC broadcast. In Wilson's native Australia, the series premiered on the Nine Network on October 15, 2013. In the Philippines, it began airing on ETC starting October 8, 2013. In Latin America, the series premiered on October 14, 2013, and it aired on the Warner Channel. In Ireland, the show was  broadcast beginning on March 10, 2014.

Reception

Critical responseSuper Fun Night received negative reviews. Review aggregator Rotten Tomatoes gives the series a score of 33% based on 40 reviews, with an average rating of 4.9 out of 10 and the consensus, "Despite the presence of the funny and talented Rebel Wilson, Super Fun Night is overreliant on tired, clichéd weight jokes."

David Hinckley of The New York Daily News gave the show a 2 stars out of 5 and said that it was "not all that much fun". Brian Lowry of Variety gave the show a negative review, calling Wilson's American accent "uncomfortable" and the material "slight". Matt Webb Mitovich of TVLine lamented that the show had replaced Happy Endings, saying that even after watching Super Fun Night a second time to make sure he hadn't "missed" something, it still disappointed. A "live-action cartoon", he particularly disliked the lead characters. Verne Gay of Newsday gave the show a B− and called Rebel Wilson the show's "glimmer of hope". Robert Bianco of USA Today gave the show a 3 out of 4 stars. Tim Goodman of The Hollywood Reporter'' gave the show a negative review.

Awards and nominations

References

External links
 

2010s American single-camera sitcoms
2013 American television series debuts
2014 American television series endings
American Broadcasting Company original programming
English-language television shows
Television series by Warner Bros. Television Studios
Television shows set in New York City
Television series by Conaco
Television series created by Rebel Wilson